Tira Klai-Angtong (born 27 June 1943) is a Thai middle-distance runner. He competed in the men's 1500 metres at the 1964 Summer Olympics.

References

1943 births
Living people
Athletes (track and field) at the 1964 Summer Olympics
Tira Klai-Angtong
Tira Klai-Angtong
Place of birth missing (living people)